ÖBB class 4020 is a 3 part electric multiple unit operated by the ÖBB (Austrian Federal Railways or Österreichische Bundesbahnen), built from 1978 until 1987 as successor of the ÖBB 4030 class.

The 4020 class is used extensively on many regional rail routes, including the Vienna S-Bahn and the Lower Inn Valley railway line around Innsbruck. Most trains bear the older blue ÖBB logo, meanwhile some, have received a new paint scheme with grey and red color, similar to that of the new ÖBB 4024 Talent trains.

References

External links 
 

Austrian Federal Railways electric multiple units
15 kV AC multiple units
Siemens multiple units